Oleksandr Tarasenko (born December 11, 1978) is a Ukrainian footballer who played as a defender.

Career  
Tarasenko played in 1994 with FC Sirius. In 1998, he played in the Ukrainian Second League with Olympia FC AEC, and was loaned to FC Mykolaiv in 2001. In 2004, he played with FC Hirnyk-Sport Horishni Plavni, and the following season he played in the Ukrainian First League with FC Ihroservice Simferopol. He continued playing in the Ukrainian First League with FC Oleksandriya in 2006, and later with FC Naftovyk-Ukrnafta Okhtyrka. In 2010, he returned to play with FC Mykolaiv, and secured the Ukrainian Second League title. The following season played abroad in the Uzbekistan Super League with FK Buxoro.

After a season abroad he returned to play with FC Mykolaiv. The following season he played with FC Tytan Armyansk. In 2014, he played in the A Lyga with FK Klaipėdos Granitas. In 2015, he signed with FK Kruoja Pakruojis, and featured in the 2015–16 UEFA Europa League against Jagiellonia Białystok. In 2016, he played in the Ukrainian Amateur Football Championship with FC Golovkovka. In 2017, he played abroad for the third time in the Canadian Soccer League with FC Ukraine United, where he assisted the Toronto club in achieving a perfect season, and winning the Second Division Championship. In 2018, he was transferred to FC Vorkuta where he won the CSL Championship.

Honors 
MFC Mykolaiv 
 Ukrainian Second League: 2010–11

FC Ukraine United 
 CSL DII Championship: 2017
 Canadian Soccer League Second Division: 2017

FC Vorkuta
 CSL Championship: 2018
 Canadian Soccer League First Division: 2019

References 

1978 births
Living people
Ukrainian footballers
FC Enerhiya Yuzhnoukrainsk players
MFC Mykolaiv players
FC Hirnyk-Sport Horishni Plavni players
FC Ihroservice Simferopol players
FC Oleksandriya players
FC Naftovyk-Ukrnafta Okhtyrka players
PFK Nurafshon players
FC Tytan Armyansk players
FK Klaipėdos Granitas players
FC Ukraine United players
FC Continentals players
Ukrainian First League players
Uzbekistan Super League players
A Lyga players
Canadian Soccer League (1998–present) players
Ukrainian Second League players
People from Zhovti Vody
Association football defenders
Sportspeople from Dnipropetrovsk Oblast